Popești is a commune located in Vâlcea County, Oltenia, Romania. It is composed of seven villages: Curtea, Dăești, Firijba, Meieni, Popești, Urși and Valea Caselor.

References

Communes in Vâlcea County
Localities in Oltenia